The KTM Class 29 is a class of mainline diesel electric locomotives built in China by Dalian Locomotive and Rolling Stock Company for operations by Keretapi Tanah Melayu of Malaysia on its freight services.

History

20 locomotives were acquired around 2005, but proved less than reliable than the Class 26 bought at the same time. By 2008 only 5 out of 20 were in service due to the high number of technical problems. As a consequence KTM had to lease locomotives from India at a cost of $1000 per train per day. As the units were still under warranty, the manufacturing company was called in and a KTMB task force was formed to fix the problem. By December 2008 eighteen units had been overhauled and were in working order.

While the main objective of the locomotive is to pull heavy freight, it easily handles local shuttle trains with an operating speed averaging 110 km/h.

See also
New Zealand DL class locomotive, similar design manufactured by Dalian Locomotive Company for export to New Zealand

References

External links 

Images

Video
, KTMB Class 26 delivery ceremony

CRRC Dalian locomotives
Co-Co locomotives
Keretapi Tanah Melayu
Diesel-electric locomotives of Malaysia
Metre gauge diesel locomotives